LHS 2090 is a red dwarf star of spectral type M6.5V, located in constellation Cancer at 20.8 light-years from Earth.

The star was identified to be a red dwarf at short distance (6 parsecs from Sun) in 2001. As typical for very cool red dwarfs, its spectrum is dominated by molecular water absorption. Stellar metallicity is similar to that of Sun`s.

Radial velocity measurements did not yield any detection of stellar companion or giant planet on orbit around LHS 2090, as in 2018.

References

Cancer (constellation)
M-type main-sequence stars
J09002359+2150054